The knockout phase of the 2012–13 UEFA Europa League began on 14 February with the round of 32 and concluded on 15 May 2013 with the final at Amsterdam Arena in Amsterdam, Netherlands.

Times up to 30 March 2013 (round of 16) are CET (UTC+1), thereafter (quarter-finals and beyond) times are CEST (UTC+2).

Round and draw dates
All draws are held at UEFA headquarters in Nyon, Switzerland.

Matches may also be played on Tuesdays or Wednesdays instead of the regular Thursdays due to scheduling conflicts.

Format
The knockout phase involves 32 teams: the 24 teams that finished in the top two in each group in the group stage and the eight teams that finished in third place in the Champions League group stage.

Each tie in the knockout phase, apart from the final, is played over two legs, with each team playing one leg at home. The team that has the higher aggregate score over the two legs progresses to the next round. In the event that aggregate scores finish level, the away goals rule is applied, i.e. the team that scored more goals away from home over the two legs progresses. If away goals are also equal, then thirty minutes of extra time are played, divided into two fifteen-minutes halves. The away goals rule is again applied after extra time, i.e. if there are goals scored during extra time and the aggregate score is still level, the visiting team qualifies by virtue of more away goals scored. If no goals are scored during extra time, the tie is decided by penalty shootout. In the final, the tie is played as a single match. If scores are level at the end of normal time in the final, extra time is played, followed by penalties if scores remain tied.

The mechanism of the draws for each round is as follows:
In the draw for the round of 32, the twelve group winners and the four better third-placed teams from the Champions League group stage (based on their match record in the group stage) are seeded, and the twelve group runners-up and the other four third-placed teams from the Champions League group stage are unseeded. A seeded team is drawn against an unseeded team, with the seeded team hosting the second leg. Teams from the same group or the same association cannot be drawn against each other.
In the draws for the round of 16 onwards, there are no seedings, and teams from the same group or the same association may be drawn against each other.

Qualified teams

Europa League group stage winners and runners-up

Champions League group stage third-placed teams

Bracket

Round of 32
The first legs were played on 14 February, and the second legs were played on 21 February 2013.

|}

First leg

Notes
Note 1: Anzhi Makhachkala played their home match at Luzhniki Stadium, Moscow instead of their regular stadium, Dynamo Stadium, Makhachkala, due to security issues involving the city of Makhachkala and the autonomous republic of Dagestan.
Note 2: BATE Borisov played their home match at Neman Stadium, Grodno instead of their regular stadium, Haradski Stadium, Barysaw.

Second leg

Rubin Kazan won 2–1 on aggregate.

Internazionale won 5–0 on aggregate.

Newcastle United won 1–0 on aggregate.

Stuttgart won 3–1 on aggregate.

Basel won 3–1 on aggregate.

Lazio won 5–3 on aggregate.

Tottenham Hotspur won 3–2 on aggregate.

Fenerbahçe won 1–0 on aggregate.

Levante won 4–0 on aggregate.

3–3 on aggregate. Zenit Saint Petersburg won on away goals.

Bordeaux won 2–1 on aggregate.

Benfica won 3–1 on aggregate.

2–2 on aggregate. Steaua București won 4–2 on penalties.

Anzhi Makhachkala won 4–2 on aggregate.

Chelsea won 2–1 on aggregate.

Viktoria Plzeň won 5–0 on aggregate.

Notes
Note 3: Rubin Kazan played their home match at Luzhniki Stadium, Moscow instead of their regular stadium, Tsentralnyi Stadion, Kazan.
Note 4: The Fenerbahçe v BATE Borisov match was played behind closed doors due to the punishment handed to Fenerbahçe by UEFA following incidents at their group stage match against Borussia Mönchengladbach on 6 December 2012.

Round of 16
The first legs were played on 7 March, and the second legs were played on 14 March 2013.

|}

First leg

Notes
Note 5: Anzhi Makhachkala played their home match at Luzhniki Stadium, Moscow instead of their regular stadium, Dynamo Stadium, Makhachkala, due to security issues involving the city of Makhachkala and the autonomous republic of Dagestan.

Second leg

Rubin Kazan won 2–0 on aggregate.

Basel won 2–1 on aggregate.

4–4 on aggregate. Tottenham Hotspur won on away goals.

Fenerbahçe won 2–1 on aggregate.

Benfica won 4–2 on aggregate.

Newcastle United won 1–0 on aggregate.

Lazio won 5–1 on aggregate.

Chelsea won 3–2 on aggregate.

Notes
Note 6: Rubin Kazan played their home match at Luzhniki Stadium, Moscow instead of their regular stadium, Tsentralnyi Stadion, Kazan.
Note 7: The Fenerbahçe v Viktoria Plzeň match was played behind closed doors due to the punishment handed to Fenerbahçe by UEFA following incidents at their round of 32 match second leg against BATE Borisov on 21 February 2013.
Note 8: The Lazio v Stuttgart match was played behind closed doors due to the punishment handed to Lazio by UEFA following incidents at their round of 32 match second leg against Borussia Mönchengladbach on 21 February 2013.

Quarter-finals
The first legs were played on 4 April, and the second legs were played on 11 April 2013.

|}

First leg

Second leg

Chelsea won 5–4 on aggregate.

4–4 on aggregate. Basel won 4–1 on penalties.

Fenerbahçe won 3–1 on aggregate.

Benfica won 4–2 on aggregate.

Notes
Note 9: Rubin Kazan played their home match at Luzhniki Stadium, Moscow instead of their regular stadium, Tsentralnyi Stadion, Kazan.
Note 10: The Lazio v Fenerbahçe match was played behind closed doors due to the punishment handed to Lazio by UEFA following incidents at their round of 32 match second leg against Borussia Mönchengladbach on 21 February 2013.

Semi-finals
The first legs were played on 25 April, and the second legs were played on 2 May 2013.

|}

First leg

Second leg

Benfica won 3–2 on aggregate.

Chelsea won 5–2 on aggregate.

Final

The final was played on 15 May 2013 at the Amsterdam Arena in Amsterdam, Netherlands.

References

External links
2012–13 UEFA Europa League, UEFA.com

3
UEFA Europa League knockout phases